The Betty Ford Center (BFC) is a non-profit, residential treatment center for persons with substance dependence in Rancho Mirage, California. It offers inpatient, outpatient, and residential day treatment for alcohol and other drug addictions, as well as prevention and education programs for family and children. The Betty Ford Center, which is adjacent to Eisenhower Medical Center but is under a separate license to practice, has 100 inpatient beds available on their campus and additional lodging for 84 clients in the Residential Day Treatment program. The Betty Ford Center opened on October 4, 1982.

History
The center was co-founded by former U.S. First Lady Betty Ford, Leonard Firestone and Dr. James West in 1982. West also served as the Betty Ford Center's first medical director from 1982 until 1989. He left that position to become the Betty Ford Center's director of outpatient services.

Betty Ford's decision to undertake such a project followed on the heels of her own battle with alcohol dependence and diazepam addiction after the Fords left the White House, and her release from the Long Beach Naval Hospital.

The Betty Ford Center merged with Hazelden Foundation on February 10, 2014, to create the Hazelden Betty Ford Foundation.

In 2015, the Betty Ford Center opened an outpatient addiction treatment clinic in West Los Angeles.

References

External links
 Hazelden Betty Ford Foundation official website
 

1982 establishments in California
Organizations established in 1982
Hospitals established in 1982
Addiction organizations in the United States
Residential treatment centers
Drug and alcohol rehabilitation centers
Hospitals in Riverside County, California
Mental health organizations in California
Organizations based in Riverside County, California
Rancho Mirage, California
Center